The Grey River is a perennial river of the Corangamite catchment, located in the Otways region of the Australian state of Victoria.

Location and features
The Grey River rises in the Otway Ranges in southwest Victoria and flows generally east by south towards the town of Grey River where the river reaches its mouth and empties into Addis Bay, part of Bass Strait, north of Cape Otway. From its highest point, the river descends  over its  course.

See also

References

External links

Corangamite catchment
Rivers of Barwon South West (region)
Otway Ranges